Week-end is a 1935 Danish film directed by Lau Lauritzen Jr. and Alice O'Fredericks.

Cast
Svend Bille
Gerd Gjedved
Per Gundmann
Betty Helsengreen
Jon Iversen
Ellen Jansø
Arthur Jensen as Styrmand
Sigfred Johansen
Sigurd Langberg
Lau Lauritzen, Jr. as Poul
Carola Merrild
Poul Reichhardt as Kaproer
Eigil Reimers
Ib Schønberg as Pouls fætter
Christian Schrøder
Nanna Stenersen as Eva
Tove Wallenstrøm as Friend

References

External links

1935 films
1930s Danish-language films
Danish black-and-white films
Films directed by Lau Lauritzen Jr.
Films directed by Alice O'Fredericks